Ralph Herbert McCabe (October 21, 1918 – May 3, 1974), nicknamed "Mack", was a Major League Baseball pitcher born in Napanee, Ontario, Canada. He appeared in one game on September 18 of the 1946 Cleveland Indians season and pitched four innings, allowing five runs off five hits, and took the loss.

External links

1918 births
1974 deaths
Baseball people from Ontario
Canadian expatriate baseball players in the United States
Cleveland Indians players
Major League Baseball pitchers
Major League Baseball players from Canada